Class 39 may refer to:

 A German passenger locomotive class with a 2-8-2 wheel arrangement operated by the Deutsche Reichsbahn: 
 Class 39.0-2: Prussian P 10
 Class 39.3: BBÖ 670
 Class 39.4: JDŽ 06
 Class 39.10p: PKP Class Pt31